Taboo Tattoo is an anime adaptation of the manga of the same title written and illustrated by Shinjirō. The series is produced by J.C.Staff and directed by Takashi Watanabe. It was broadcast between July 4, 2016 and September 19, 2016. The opening theme is "Belief" by May'n, while the ending theme is "EGOISTIC EMOTION" by idol unit TRIGGER, which is composed of Izzy's and Tōko's voice actors, Mikako Komatsu and Chika Anzai respectively. The program aired weekly on a number of Japanese channels which are TV Tokyo, AT-X and BS Japan while outside Japan, it was being simulcasted by Crunchyroll and Funimation released it on home video as part of the two companies' partnership.


Episode list

References

Lists of anime episodes